Johan Röjler (born 11 November 1981) is an ice speed skater from Sweden, who represented his native country in three consecutive Winter Olympics, starting in 2002 in Salt Lake City. His main achievements were held as a junior, when he won the Men's Allround Junior World Championship title in they year 2000 and took several medals, including 6 golds at Junior Nordic Games.

References

External links
 Photos of Johan Røjler 

1981 births
Living people
Swedish male speed skaters
Speed skaters at the 2002 Winter Olympics
Speed skaters at the 2006 Winter Olympics
Speed skaters at the 2010 Winter Olympics
Olympic speed skaters of Sweden
Sportspeople from Örebro
21st-century Swedish people